The Manitowoc Post was a German language weekly newspaper with some items in English, published primarily in Manitowoc, Wisconsin from July 2, 1881 to November 29, 1924.

It was founded by A. Wittman in Manitowoc. From July 8, 1897-January 9, 1914, it was called the Two Rivers Post before reverting to its original name. From January 6, 1923 until it ceased publication, it was also published in Winona, Minnesota, home of the related Westlicher Herold.

References 

1881 establishments in Wisconsin
1924 disestablishments in Wisconsin
Defunct newspapers published in Wisconsin
Defunct weekly newspapers
German-language newspapers published in Wisconsin
Manitowoc County, Wisconsin
Publications disestablished in 1924
Publications established in 1881
Weekly newspapers published in the United States